Clinton High School is a 9th - 12th grade public high school in Clinton, Oklahoma. Clinton High School's mascot is the Red Tornado.

Extracurricular activities

Athletics
Fall- football, fastpitch softball, volleyball, cross country

Winter- basketball, wrestling, weight lifting

Spring-  baseball, track, soccer, golf

Notable alumni
 Roy Bell, former CFL All-star
 Cal Browning, Major League Baseball pitcher for St Louis Cardinals

References

External links
 Clinton High School

Public high schools in Oklahoma